The 22nd Texas Cavalry Regiment was a unit of mounted volunteers from Texas that fought in the Confederate States Army during the American Civil War. The regiment first began organizing in late 1861 and by July 1862, it moved to the Indian Territory. The unit fought at Newtonia and McGuire's Store in fall 1862 and was dismounted soon after. The regiment fought as infantry at Prairie  Grove in December 1862. It traveled to Louisiana in March 1863 where it joined a brigade led by Camille de Polignac. In 1864 the regiment fought at Mansfield, Pleasant Hill, and Yellow Bayou during the Red River Campaign. In March 1865 the regiment marched to Texas where it disbanded in May.

See also
List of Texas Civil War Confederate units

Notes

References

Units and formations of the Confederate States Army from Texas
1861 establishments in Texas
1865 disestablishments in Texas
Military units and formations disestablished in 1865
Military units and formations established in 1861